Thamsanqa Teyise (born 12 August 1986 in Alexandria, Eastern Cape) is a South African football (soccer) defender who last played for Ajax Cape Town.

Club career
Teyise joined AmaZulu in January 2011 from Port Shepstone-based Vodacom League side, Gamalakhe United which is also known as SAP Callies in the 2010–11 season. He made his league debut just days after signing on 16 January 2011 against Lamontville Golden Arrows. He scored his first AmaZulu goals when he netted a brace in a 3–0 win over Golden Arrows at the King Zwelithini Stadium on 16 December 2014. He signed a pre-contract with SuperSport United in January 2014.

He joined Supersport United in July 2014. He made his debut on 9 August 2014 in a 1–0 win over Bidvest Wits.

References

 Rosslee – We tried to keep Teyise

1986 births
Living people
People from Ndlambe Local Municipality
South African soccer players
AmaZulu F.C. players
SuperSport United F.C. players
Maritzburg United F.C. players
Free State Stars F.C. players
Cape Town Spurs F.C. players
Association football defenders
South African Premier Division players